The Indian Liberal Group is a think tank founded in 1965 by Minoo Masani, author and parliamentarian, to promote the liberal point of view and educate the public on the concept of libertarianism. Its headquarters is in Mumbai. Meera Sanyal serves as the current president.

Organization structure
The ILG has local chapters, a state executive and a national executive. National Conventions are held every two years. All current members of the organization can attend the National Convention, which serves as the policy making body.

People
Among the founding members of the Group were Prof. B. R. Shenoy, H.V.R. Iyengar, Fredie Mehta, Khushwant Singh, Sophie Wadia, and G V Sundaram. S.V. Raju is the immediate past president of the organization.

Activities
Indian Liberal Group presents a Liberal Budget  every year as an alternative version to the Annual Budget presented to the Parliament by the Union Finance Minister. Eminent economists are part of the drafting committees of these Liberal Budgets.

On October 8 and 9, 2010, ILG organized a symposium titled "India - the next decade" in Mumbai.

The local chapters organize perform a variety of activities like Minoo Masani Memorial Lectures, protests for the cause of Bhopal Gas Tragedy victims, organising a 'parliament of students' on board exams and campaigns to improve the quality of education in Medical colleges.

References

External links
 Indian Liberal Group Official site
 Official site of Meera Sanyal as an Independent Candidate in the 2009 Lok Sabha Elections for South Mumbai.

Libertarian think tanks
Non-profit organisations based in India
Think tanks based in India
Libertarianism in India